Kotarszyn  is a village in the administrative district of Gmina Waśniów, within Ostrowiec County, Świętokrzyskie Voivodeship, in south-central Poland.

The village has a population of 250.

References

Villages in Ostrowiec County